Andrés A. Mesa (born 1919) was a Cuban baseball left fielder in the Negro leagues. He played with Indianapolis Clowns in 1948.

References

External links
 and Seamheads

1919 births
Possibly living people
Indianapolis Clowns players
Cuban baseball players
Baseball outfielders
Cuban expatriates in the United States
People from Matanzas Province